Silent Sonata is a 2011 Slovenian war drama film directed by Janez Burger and has no dialogue. The main producers are the Slovene Stara Gara and the Irish Fastnet Films. Silent Sonata is the first official Slovene-Irish-Swedish-Finnish co-production and was shot in 35 days in Slovenia and Ireland. The world premiere took place on the International Film Festival Rotterdam in 2011. The production crew included members from at least 18 countries. The film's original title was Circus Fantasticus, but only in Slovenia, as it is distributed under its original title.
 
The film was selected as the Slovenian entry for the Best Foreign Language Film at the 84th Academy Awards, however, the Society of Slovene filmmakers (Društvo slovenskih filmskih ustvarjalcev, DSFU) neglected to officially submit the entry in time because of a misunderstanding within the organization, so it wasn't included in the final list of entries.

Cast
 Leon Lučev as Father
 Ravil Sultanov as Circus Leader
 Pauliina Räsänen as Beauty
 René Bazinet as Old Man
 Daniel Rovai as Clown
 Enej Grom as Boy
 Luna Mijović as Daughter
 David Boelee as Fire Blower
 Marjuta Slamič as Dead Wife
 Devi Bragalini as Son
 Nataša Sultanova as Female Clown
 Slava Volkov as Muscle Man

Awards
 13th Festival of Slovenian Film Portorož
 Vesna Award for Best Feature Film
 Vesna Award for Best Director 
 Vesna Award for Best Supporting Actor
 Vesna Award for Best Music 
 Vesna Award for Best Sound 
 Vesna Award for Best Make-up 
 Award of Slovenian film critics for Best Feature Film
 Kodak Award for Best Photography
 58th Pula Film Festival
 Best Actors Award - Awarded to the entire cast
 Alexandria International Film Festival
 Best Artistic Achievement Award

See also
 List of Slovenian films
 List of submissions to the 84th Academy Awards for Best Foreign Language Film
 List of Slovenian submissions for the Academy Award for Best Foreign Language Film

References

External links
 Official website
 

2011 films
2011 drama films
Slovenian drama films
Films without speech
2011 war drama films